Alexis Masbou (born 2 June 1987) is a French motorcycle rider. He currently rides a Yamaha YZF-R1 in the Endurance FIM World Cup.

Career

Early career
Masbou was born in Albi. Before he reached the world championship he was joining the CDM French motorsport school. He started racing in the 50cc French class in 2001. From 2002 he stepped up to the national 125cc class. He was very successful and looked to be the next French revelation. In 2003 he made his wild-card debut at the Le Mans GP. In 2004 he became the national 125cc champion and he was ready to challenge the World Championship riders.

125cc/Moto3 World Championship
In 2005 he signed for the Ajo Moto Honda team to compete in the 125cc class, teamed with Japanese youngster Tomoyoshi Koyama. Masbou had a good debut season, with a best result of fifth in the Dutch TT, having run in the leading group throughout. For 2006 he rode an unfashionable Malaguti, with little success. In 2007 he again raced a Honda, finishing 21st overall  best results were two tenth places. For 2008 he joined the new Loncin team, struggling to make this bike competitive and scoring four points. For 2009 he was joined in the Loncin team by Koyama.

At the 2014 Czech Republic Grand Prix, Masbou achieved his first victory at World Championship level after prevailing in a 17-rider lead battle, holding off Enea Bastianini and Danny Kent on the final lap.

Masbou gets another win At 2015 Qatar motorcycle Grand Prix.

Masbou still remained with the team for 2016 season, but the team will use newly Peugeot MGP3O. After failing to score a single point in nine races he was replaced by Albert Arenas ahead of the Austrian Grand Prix.

He will be ineligible to compete in Moto3 in 2017 due to the age limit.

Career statistics

Grand Prix motorcycle racing

Races by year
(key) (Races in bold indicate pole position; races in italics indicate fastest lap)

References

External links

125cc World Championship riders
French motorcycle racers
1987 births
Living people
Moto3 World Championship riders